Else Ragni Yttredal (born 8 August 1968) is a Norwegian speed skater. She was born in Asker and represented the club Asker SK. She competed at the 1992 Winter Olympics in Albertville.

She was Norwegian all-round champion in 1991, 1992 and 1993.

References

External links 
 

1968 births
Living people
People from Asker
Norwegian female speed skaters
Olympic speed skaters of Norway
Speed skaters at the 1992 Winter Olympics
Sportspeople from Viken (county)